Martín Prechtel is an American author and educator. From New Mexico, he traveled to Guatemala in 1970. There he moved into a Tz'utujil community near Lake Atitlan. He learned their Mayan language and studied with a shaman.

He assimilated into village life, marrying a Tz'utujil woman and having a family with her. During the extended Guatemalan civil war, Prechtel and his family fled to the United States for safety. The couple separated, and their two sons joined their father in the US.

He began teaching, based on his understanding of Maya spirituality and contributed to workshops sponsored by poet Robert Bly, a leader in  the Men's Movement. Prechtel has published several nonfiction books drawing from his time in Santiago Atitlan, Guatemala; the first was published in 1998, and the most recent in 2015. Prechtel moved back to New Mexico near Ojo Caliente, where he operates a school. He also lectures and gives workshops on spirituality.

Life 
Prechtel was raised at Santo Domingo Pueblo near Ojo Caliente, New Mexico. He learned the Keres language as well as English growing up. He claimed that his mother was a First Nations Canadian, and his father a Swiss paleontologist.

Guatemala 
In 1970 his mother died and Prechtel ended his first marriage. He started traveling, going south through Mexico and entering Guatemala. After a year of traveling through the country, he settled in a small village near Lake Atitlan, which was inhabited by the Tz'utujil (one of the numerous ethnic Maya peoples). There he met Nicolas Chiviliu Tacaxoy, a respected shaman of the village, who Prechtel says identified him as the student he had prayed for. The American began studying with the Maya shaman.

Prechtel learned the Tzutujil language, married a Tzutujil woman, and helped raise their two sons (a third son died young). When his teacher and mentor Chiviliu died, Prechtel wrote that he became the spiritual leader for the approximately 30,000 people of Santiago Atitlan.

Prechtel also wrote that he joined the Scat Mulaj (the village political body). During his time there, he wrote that he rose to the position of Nabey Mam (the first chief). He was responsible for leading the initiation and ritual passage of the village's young men into adulthood. As the violence of the Guatemalan civil war (1960–1996) increased, when government forces were attacking the Mayan villages in the highlands, Prechtel and his family fled for their lives. In 1984 they settled in the U.S. His wife returned to Guatemala later with their two sons, and the couple divorced. The two boys later returned to the US to live with their father.

Upon resettling in the US, Prechtel was introduced to poet Robert Bly, who was active in leading what he called a Men's Movement. He began contributing to Bly's workshops, and Bly was instrumental in getting Prechtel's writing published, writing the foreword to his first book, which was published in 1998.

New Mexico 
Prechtel married again, to a woman named Hanna, and resides in New Mexico, at the site of the school he founded near his former home village of Ojo Caliente. The school is called Bolad's Kitchen. Prechtel speaks at different international educational conferences and leads workshops to assist in individuals reconnecting to the sacredness in nature and daily life. In addition, he helps them find a sense of purpose in the modern world. Colleagues include Robert Bly, Malidoma Somé, and Michael J Meade.

Writing 
Prechtel has published several nonfiction books drawing from his learning among the Maya in Guatemala. These include Secrets of the Talking Jaguar (1998), an autobiographical account of his initiation as a Maya spiritual leader, which is likely the best known. Robert Bly wrote the foreword. Publishers Weekly said he described his apprenticeship to a shaman and 13 years of living as a Tzutujil, saying "his view seems at times romanticized" but he portrays an "idyllic Indian life" of "colorful rituals and rapport with nature."

Long Life, Honey in the Heart (1999) is an account of his village life in Santiago Atitlán; Stealing Benefacio's Roses: A Mayan Epic (formerly titled The Toe Bone and The Tooth), an autobiographical account of how he relived an ancient Mayan myth; and The Disobedience of the Daughter of the Sun, a Mayan myth that includes Prechtel's observations of how the Maya relate to the story.

Prechtel published a collection of short stories, The Smell of Rain on Dust: Grief and Praise, in 2015, dealing with the modern experience of grief and how the absence of praise worthy things in life robs modern people of the ability to genuinely grieve.

In 2021, Prechtel published Rescuing the Light: Quotes from the Oral Teachings of Martín Prechtel, a collection of quotations that Prechtel delivered at his school in New Mexico, Bolad's Kitchen, as well as The Mare and the Mouse: Stories of My Horses Vol I.

In addition, Prechtel has published audiobooks of The Unlikely Peace at Chuchamaquic (2020), The Smell of Rain on Dust (2020), Rescuing the Light (2021), The Disobedience of the Daughter of the Sun (2021), Stealing Benefacio's Roses (2021) and Long Life, Honey in the Heart (2022), all read by the Author.

His works also include paintings and various musical recordings.

Bibliography 
Secrets of the Talking Jaguar: A Mayan Shaman's Journey to the Heart of the Indigenous Soul (1999)
Long Life, Honey in the Heart (1999)
Stealing Benefacio's Roses: A Mayan Epic  (formerly titled The Toe Bone and the Tooth: An Ancient Mayan Story Relived in Modern Times: Leaving Home to Come Home) (2003)
The Disobedience of the Daughter of the Sun: A Mayan Tale of Ecstasy, Time, and Finding One's True Form (2005)
The Unlikely Peace at Cuchumaquic: The Parallel Lives of People as Plants: Keeping the Seeds Alive (2012)
The Smell of Rain on Dust: Grief and Praise (2015)
Rescuing the Light: Quotes from the Oral Teachings of Martín Prechtel (2021)
The Mare and the Mouse: Stories of My Horses Vol. I (2021)

See also 
 New Age
 Plastic shaman

References

Further reading 
 Jensen, Derrick. 2011. Truths Among Us: Conversations on Building a New Culture. Oakland, CA: PM Press. Martín Prechtel, pp. 233–257.

External links
Official Site

American memoirists
Shamanism of the Americas
Writers from New Mexico
American expatriates in Guatemala
People from Taos County, New Mexico
Living people
Year of birth missing (living people)